General elections were held in Saint Helena on 17 July 2013.

Electoral system
The 12 elected members of the Legislative Council were elected in a single constituency, with voters having 12 votes to cast. This marked a change from the 2009 elections, which saw Council members elected in two six-seat constituencies. A further three ex officio members were appointed to the Council.

A total of 20 candidates registered for the elections.

Results

References

Elections in Saint Helena
Saint Helena
Saint Helena
2013 in Saint Helena
July 2013 events in Africa
Non-partisan elections